Belleli is a surname. Notable people with the surname include:

 Avi Belleli (born 1963), Israeli singer and musician
 Hasmig Belleli, Canadian politician 
 Lajos Belleli (born 1977), Hungarian male curler and curling coach

See also
 Bellelli